The 2018–19 Derde Divisie season was the third in the new Dutch fourth tier.

In May 2019, the referee scored a goal for HSV Hoek against Harkemase Boys. The goal was all the more noteworthy because it occurred on the last weekend possible before rules changes came into effect from 1 June to stop this kind of activity on the part of the referee.

Saturday league

Teams

Standings

Sunday league

Teams

Standings

Promotion/relegation play-offs Derde Divisie and Hoofdklasse 
The numbers 15 and 16 of each of the 2018–19 Derde Divisies (2 times 2 teams) and the 3 (substitute) period winners of each of the 2018–19 Hoofdklassen (4 times 3 teams), making 16 teams, decide in a 3-round 2-leg knockout system, which 3 teams play next season in the 2019–20 Derde Divisie leagues. The remaining 13 teams play next season in the 2019–20 Hoofdklasse leagues. Contrary to previous seasons, the play-offs for Saturday and Sunday teams are not fully separated any more.

First round
The 4 Derde Divisie teams and the 4 highest ranked (substitute) period winners (HPWs) from the Hoofdklassen are released from playing the first round. Teams are paired in such a way that the 2 middle ranked (substitute) period winners (MPWs) from the Saturday Hoofdklassen play against the lowest ranked (substitute) period winners (LPWs) from the other Saturday Hoofdklasse. The same applies for the Sunday MPWs and LPWs. So at this stage there will be no matches yet between Saturday and Sunday teams. The lowest ranked teams (LPWs) will play the first match at home, and the highest ranked teams (MPWs) the second match.

Second round
In the second round there're still no matches between Saturday and Sunday teams. The following applies identical for the Saturday as well as Sunday teams. The highest ranked Derde Divisie team (H3D) will play against the winner of the match between the LPW of the A league against the MPW of the B league. The lowest ranked Derde Divisie team (L3D) will play against the HPW of the A league. The HPW of the B league will play against the winner of the match between the LPW of the B league against the MPW of the A league. The lowest ranked teams will play the first match at home, and the highest ranked teams the second match.

Finals
The first final is between the winners of the 2 matches in which the Derde Divisie Saturday teams play. The second final is between the winners of the 2 matches in which the Derde Divisie Sunday teams play. The consequence is that at least 1 Saturday and at least 1 Sunday Derde Divisie team will relegate. The third final is between the winners of the 2 remaining matches. This is the only play-offs match in which a Saturday and a Sunday team will face each other and for sure both teams will be Hoofdklasse period winners. Therefore, at least 1 Hoofdklasse team will promote.

 Qualified Teams 

 Results

References 

Derde Divisie seasons
4
Ned